Huangcun railway station (黄村火车站) is a station on Beijing–Shanghai Railway and Beijing–Kowloon Railway in Daxing District, Beijing.

Beijing Subway
The subway station was opened on December 30, 2010.

Station Layout 
The station has an underground island platform.

Exits 
There are 4 exits, lettered A, B, C, and D. Exit A is accessible.

See also
Beijing Daxing railway station, a high-speed rail station on Beijing–Xiong'an intercity railway, is located near Huangcun railway station.

References

External links

Railway stations in Daxing District
Beijing Subway stations in Daxing District
Stations on the Beijing–Kowloon Railway
Stations on the Beijing–Shanghai Railway
Railway stations in China opened in 1895
Railway stations in China opened in 2010